Parapercis dockinsi is a fish species in the sandperch family, Pinguipedidae. It is found in the Southeastern Pacific and is believed to be endemic to Juan Fernández Island.

Etymology
The fish is named in honor of zoologist Donald M. Dockins (1930-1975), of the Scripps Institution of Oceanography.

References

Rosa, I.L. and R.S. Rosa, 1997. Systematic revision of the South American species of Pinguipedidae (Teleostei, Trachinoidei). Revta Bras. Zool. 14(4):845-865.

Pinguipedidae
Taxa named by John E. McCosker
Fish described in 1971